Kooser is a surname. Notable people with the surname include:

Barry Kooser (born 1968), American artist, painter, and documentary filmmaker 
Ted Kooser (born 1939), American poet

See also
Kooper